The Belgian Shepherd  (also known as the Belgian Sheepdog, Belgian Malinois, or the Chien de Berger Belge) is a breed of medium-sized herding dog from Belgium. While predominantly considered a single breed, it is bred in four distinct varieties based on coat type and colour; the long-haired black Groenendael, the rough-haired fawn Laekenois, the short-haired fawn Malinois, and the long-haired fawn Tervuren; in the United States the American Kennel Club considers the four varieties to be separate breeds.

The breed descends from a common type of shepherd dog found throughout Western Europe that includes such modern breeds as the Bouvier des Ardennes, Dutch Shepherd and German Shepherd. A common sight in the service of Belgian shepherds for centuries, it was not until the end of the 19th century that a breed club was formed and attempts were made to standardise the breed.

In addition to its historical role as a herding dog, Belgian Shepherds have been used as assistance dogs, companion dogs, detection dogs, guard dogs, guide dogs, police dogs, and search and rescue dogs. The breed has a long history of being used by military forces, serving in both World Wars; they continue to be used by a number of militaries in a variety of roles to this day.

Description

Appearance
The breed's body is muscular but not overly heavy; the body's length from shoulder to haunches is approximately the same as their height at the withers, proportionally slightly longer in bitches; they have a straight topline and their belly is neither low-slung nor overly high like that of a sighthound. The breed's chest is deep but not overly broad; their neck is muscular, widening at the shoulders with a slight arch at the nape; their tail is strong and of medium length and curves upwards slightly at the level of their knee; their forelegs are straight and well-boned, their hind legs are muscular and very powerful, none of the legs are overly heavy.

The four varieties vary principally in their coat types and colours, the breed standard describes three coat varieties; long-haired, short-haired and rough-haired. Long-haired dogs have a long, smooth coat with short hair on their faces, ears and legs although there is long feathering on the rear of the legs, they have an abundant mane on their neck and chest, particularly long hair on the rear of their thighs and a bushy tail that forms a plume. Short-haired dogs have particularly short hair on the faces, ears and lower portion of their legs, short over the rest of the body and slightly longer on the neck and tail.

The Groenendael variety is long-haired, it has a solid black double coat, the outer coat is straight and particularly long around the shoulders, neck and chest; they have short hair on the face, and well feathered legs and tail.

The Laekenois variety is rough-haired, its coat is fawn in colour with discreet black overlay and is harsh, dry and normally slightly tangled in appearance; it has a bristled, feathered muzzle and limited feathering on the legs and tail. According to the breed standard, black overlay means the tips of the hair are black but not in patches or stripes such as brindle.

The Malinois variety is short-haired, it is fawn in colour with black overlay, with a charcoal-coloured face and extremities.

The Tervuren variety is long-haired like the Groenendael; its double coat is typically fawn in colour with black overlay and with black extremities, although grey with black is known; it has a ruff of long hair around the neck and feathering on the legs.

Temperament
Belgian Shepherds are known to be highly intelligent, alert and sensitive; they are typically highly trainable, vigilant and hard-working with a strong guarding instinct making them protective of property and family, and very well suited for service with security services. The Groenendael and Tervueren varieties have a reputation for occasionally being snappy, making them less suitable as companion dogs for children; the Laekenois, whilst considered very good with children, can occasionally be troublesome with other dogs. The Belgian Shepherd responds well to training and responds very well to firm and understanding training; they require training from an early age, particularly the Laekenois which can have a tendency to try to dominate a weaker-willed master. The breed is very active, particularly the Malinois which may reflect its continued breeding for security roles, and they all require exercise; the breed adapts well to living indoors, although the Malinois is least suited to these environments.

History
Belgian Shepherds descend from a common type of herding dog as similar Western European breeds like the Bouvier des Ardennes, Dutch Shepherd and German Shepherd, and for centuries they were used by Belgian shepherds for this task. Unlike in other European countries where, throughout the 19th century, shepherd breeds were standardised and breeders made efforts to perpetuate their breeds, by the end of the century the Belgian Shepherd was becoming obsolete and was at danger of extinction. In 1891, the Club de Chien Berger Belge was formed with the purpose of saving the type and a team led by Professor Adolphe Reul of the Cureghem Veterinary School conducted a field survey of the type. As the Belgian Shepherd had for centuries been bred for working ability with little consideration given to form, Professor Reul found the type to vary greatly in appearance. As a part of their work, Professor Reul's team assembled 117 specimens and began the process of standardising them into distinct varieties. Classifying them as a single breed, initially Professor Reul's team divided the breed into six different varieties based on coat type and colour; between 1892 when the first breed standard was drafted and 1956, as few as two varieties and as many as eight were recognised by either the Club de Chien Berger Belge or the Société Royale Saint-Hubert.

In 1905 it was decided that interbreeding between the different varieties should be forbidden, but the disruptions caused by the First World War resulted in a decline in breed numbers, so in 1920 it was decided matings between the varieties should be allowed in order to preserve the breed and avoid issues resulting from inbreeding. The Second World War once again threatened the viability of the breed and in late 1945, it was decided once again that matings between dogs of the different varieties was to be encouraged, and through careful breeding the Belgian Shepherd recovered in numbers. In 1956 the current breed standard was adopted and it specified the four varieties known today; the Groenendael, Laekenois, Malinois and Tervuren.

The Groenendael variety is believed to have been created in 1885 by Nicholas Rose, owner of the Château de Groenendael. Rose owned a long-haired, black Belgian Shepherd bitch called "Petite", liking her look so much he spent over a year searching for a suitable mate, eventually finding a dog named "Piccard D'Uccle" who belonged to a shepherd called Mr Beernaert, these two are considered the foundation stock of the variety. Their finest progeny were called "Duc de Groenendael" and "Barroness" who were mated widely to Belgian Shepherds of different appearances with the black progeny retained. Initially Rose had wanted to name the variety the "Rose", but it was deemed this could cause confusion given their black colour so they were instead named after his château, Groenendael. During the First World War, Groenendaels were used by the Belgian Army to locate wounded soldiers and carry messages, their bravery was recognised by U.S. soldiers during the war and examples were imported to the U.S. in the following years; to this day in the US the name Belgian Shepherd or Belgian Sheepdog is commonly used to refer to the Groenendael.

The Malinois variety was said to be the first variety to breed true to type and initially they became so well-known in Belgium that at one time the other varieties were collectively called "other-than-Malinois", it was the Malinois that the other varieties were gauged against. The variety takes its name from the Mechelen region (called Malines in French), where it was the predominant coat type used by the local shepherds.

The Laekenois variety has always been the rarest; they take their name from the Château de Laeken, a residence of the Belgian royal family. The Laekenois was a favourite of Queen Marie Henriette, who frequently watched them in the service of the shepherds who grazed the royal domains around the château; this patronage contributed to their popularity at the time. In addition to being used as herding dogs, rough-haired Belgian Shepherds were traditionally used as guard dogs in the regions surrounding Boom, guarding valuable linens put out to bleach in the sun.

The Tervuren variety is believed to have been created when a brewer, M. Corbeel, bred his fawn long-haired Belgian Shepherd pair "Tom" and "Poes", one of their progeny was a long-haired fawn bitch named "Miss" who was purchased by a M. Deanhieux. Miss was bred with Duc de Groenendael, the foundation sire of the Groenendael variety, and the fawn progeny became the Tervuren variety who take their name from the region of Tervuren. The Tervuren variety is considered particularly robust and healthy and in Europe a number of breeders use them to reinforce the bloodlines of other varieties, particularly the Groenendael.

Kennel club classification
Most of the world's national kennel clubs including the Société Royale Saint-Hubert, as well as the Fédération Cynologique Internationale, recognise the Belgian Shepherd as a single breed with four distinct varieties. Notably, the American Kennel Club recognises the four varieties as separate breeds; this has caused some consternation for American breeders who breed from imported European stock. European Groenendaels in particular can whelp Tervuren-coloured pups; in most of the world these can be registered as Tervurens, whereas in the United States these pups would be disqualified from registration.

Popularity and uses
The Groenendael remains the most popular variety followed by the Tervuren. The Malinois is gaining in popularity while the Laekenois remains comparatively rare. Extremely versatile, Belgian Shepherds are frequently trained for use as assistance dogs, detection dogs, guard dogs, guide dogs, police dogs, and search and rescue dogs. The breed, in particular the Groenendael, Laekenois and Tervuren varieties, are predominantly kept as pets or companion dogs; all of the varieties are frequently seen competing in obedience competitions and Schutzhund.

In recent times, the Laekenois has been employed by the Belgian Army in a variety of roles, and the Tervuren is frequently used by government organisations as a drug detection dog. The Malinois in particular has become increasingly popular with customs, military, border guard and police forces; organisations that utilise the Malinois include the United States Armed Forces, the United States Secret Service, the Israel Defense Forces' Oketz Unit, the Australian Defence Force, and the anti-poaching canine unit at the Kruger National Park.

Health
Belgian Shepherds are considered to be a relatively healthy breed with a life expectancy of 12 to 14 years, although skin allergies, eye problems and dysplasia are seen. The Société Royale Saint-Hubert recommends all four varieties are tested for hip and elbow dysplasia and that the Malinois be tested for epilepsy.

Notable examples
 Conan, United States Army Malinois that assisted in the capture and killing of Abu Bakr al-Baghdadi.
 Diesel, French police Malinois that was posthumously awarded the PDSA Dickin Medal after he was killed in the 2015 Saint-Denis raid.
 K9 Killer, Kruger National Park anti-poaching dog Malinois awarded the PDSA Gold Medal for assisting in the capture of 115 poachers.
 King Tut, US President Herbert Hoover's pet Malinois.
 Kuga, Australian Army Malinois awarded the Dickin Medal after capturing an insurgent whilst shot during the War in Afghanistan.
 Mali, British Army Malinois awarded the Dickin Medal after completing a mission whilst injured during the War in Afghanistan.

See also

 Max (2015 film) and Dog (2022 film) both feature Malinois.
 Jim's dog Wilson from Channel 4 series Friday Night Dinner is a Malinois. 
 List of dog breeds.

References

External links

 World Federation Belgium Shepherds／Federation Mondiale du Berger Belges
 

Dog breeds
Dog breeds originating in Belgium
FCI breeds
Herding dogs